Castine may refer to:

Castine, Maine, U.S.
Castine (CDP), Maine, the main village in the town
Castine, Ohio, U.S.
USS Castine, two ships in the United States Navy

See also